Elizabeth Leigh Vassey (born August 9, 1972) is an American actress. Her most notable roles include Emily Ann Sago on All My Children, Captain Liberty on The Tick, Wendy Simms on CSI: Crime Scene Investigation, Lou on Brotherly Love, and Nikki Beaumont on the web series Nikki & Nora.

Early life, family and education

Vassey was born in Raleigh, North Carolina. She graduated from Chamberlain High School in Tampa, Florida in 1990.

Career 
Vassey played teenager Emily Ann Sago on the soap opera All My Children from 1988 to 1991. From  2004 to 2005, she had a recurring role on the series Tru Calling as Dr. Carrie Allen. 

She appeared in several episodes of the sitcom Two and a Half Men. In the episode "The Last Thing You Want is to Wind Up with a Hump" in 2003, in "Twanging Your Magic Clanger" and "The Crazy Bitch Gazette" (2011), and in "Nice to Meet You, Walden Schmidt" (the season premiere with Ashton Kutcher). 

From 2005 to 2010, Vassey had a recurring role as Wendy Simms on CSI: Crime Scene Investigation. Starting with the tenth season, Vassey was promoted to a regular cast member and began appearing in the show's opening credits. Entertainment Weekly reported on June 1, 2010 that Vassey would not be returning for the show's eleventh season. She guested in one episode of that season.

Vassey made a cameo on Joss Whedon's web-based musical, Dr. Horrible's Sing-Along Blog, as "Fury Leika".

Personal life
Vassey is married to David Emmerichs, a camera operator.

In 2002, along with fellow actress Kristin Bauer, Vassey started a company called Neurosis to a T(ee), which designs and sells slogan-covered T-shirts for women. The slogans poke fun at female worries and neuroses, often relating to relationships.

Filmography

Film

Television

Web

Awards 
 1990 Daytime Emmy Award for Outstanding Juvenile Female in a Drama Series on All My Children (nominated).

References

External links 

1972 births
Actresses from North Carolina
American film actresses
American soap opera actresses
American television actresses
George D. Chamberlain High School alumni
Living people
Actors from Raleigh, North Carolina
20th-century American actresses
21st-century American actresses